Jesse Pellot-Rosa (born July 4, 1984) is an American former professional basketball player.

College career
He went to George Wythe High School and college at Virginia Commonwealth University (VCU) (2003-2007).

Professional career
After going undrafted at the 2007 NBA draft, Pellot-Rosa has been active with different teams in Argentina's Liga Nacional de Básquet, Puerto Rico's Baloncesto Superior Nacional, and other European leagues. In 2009, he won both the BSN Most Improved Player and the BSN Most Valuable Player Award. He was also named as part of the league All-Star Team.

In May 2017, Úrvalsdeild karla club Þór Þorlákshöfn announced it had signed Pellot-Rosa for the upcoming 2017–18 season. On October 1, he helped Þór win the Icelandic Supercup by defeating the defending national champions KR 90-86. In the game he had 37 points and 11 rebounds. Pellot-Rosa left the club in November due to injury after averaging 20.8 points and 7.2 rebounds.

The Basketball Tournament
In 2017, Pellot-Rosa participated in The Basketball Tournament for Ram Nation, a team of VCU alumni. The team made it to the Elite 8 where they lost to eventual tournament champs Overseas Elite. The Basketball Tournament is an annual $2 million winner-take-all tournament broadcast on ESPN.

See also

List of Puerto Ricans

References

External links
BSNPR.com profile
ESPN profile
Úrvalsdeild statistics

1984 births
Living people
American men's basketball players
Atléticos de San Germán players
Baloncesto Superior Nacional players
Basketball players from Richmond, Virginia
Forwards (basketball)
Keflavík men's basketball players
Piratas de Quebradillas players
Puerto Rican men's basketball players
SISU BK players
Úrvalsdeild karla (basketball) players
VCU Rams men's basketball players
Þór Þorlákshöfn (basketball club) players